"That Girl" is a song by English reggae singer Maxi Priest featuring Jamaican reggae musician Shaggy. It was released on  10 June 1996 as the first single from Priest's sixth album, Man with the Fun (1996). The song reached the top 20 in at least eight countries, including the United Kingdom, where it peaked at  15 on the UK Singles Chart. It also peaked at No. 3 on the Finnish Singles Chart, No. 4 on the Canadian RPM Top Singles chart, No. 7 on the Australian Singles Chart and No. 20 on the US Billboard Hot 100. The song samples the 1962 instrumental "Green Onions" by Booker T. & the M.G.'s.

Critical reception
Larry Flick from Billboard wrote, "Maxi Priest ushers in his new album, "Man With The Fun", with a little festive toasting assistance from Shaggy. The two playfully mix it up on a finger-snapping ditty that is fueled by the sampled hook of "Green Onions" by Booker T. & the MG's. Priest has rarely sounded so relaxed and sexy. With a steamy groove and a chorus that you will be singing along with by its close, this single is ripe for mega pop success."

Track listings
 UK CD1 and cassette single, Australasian CD single
 "That Girl" – 4:00
 "That Girl" (urban mix) – 3:43
 "That Girl" (club mix) – 8:03
 "Ooh La La La" – 3:48

 UK CD2
 "That Girl" – 4:00
 "That Girl" (dub mix) – 7:11
 "All the Way" – 5:04
 "Tenderoni" – 3:43

 US CD and cassette single
 "That Girl" – 4:00
 "That Girl" (urban mix) – 3:43
 "Heartbreak Lover" (featuring Beres Hammond and Buju Banton) – 3:25
 "That Girl" (club edit) – 3:43

 US 12-inch single
A1. "That Girl" (LP version) – 4:00
A2. "That Girl" (club edit) – 3:43
A3. "That Girl" (club mix) – 8:03
B1. "That Girl" (urban extended mix) – 4:27
B2. "That Girl" (dubstramental) – 7:18
B3. "Heartbreak Lover" (featuring Beres Hammond and Buju Banton) – 3:25

Charts and certifications

Weekly charts

Year-end charts

Certifications

Release history

References

1996 songs
1996 singles
Maxi Priest songs
Shaggy (musician) songs
Songs written by Booker T. Jones
Songs written by Shaggy (musician)
Songs written by Steve Cropper
Songs written by Al Jackson Jr.
Songs written by Gary Benson (musician)
Virgin Records singles